Mark O'Donoghue (born 10 July 1967) is a former Australian rules footballer who played for North Melbourne in the Victorian Football League (VFL).

O'Donoghue spent the 1988 VFL season at North Melbourne and kicked two goals on debut against Geelong, a debut he shared with Mick Martyn. He represented New South Wales at the 1988 Adelaide Bicentennial Carnival. The rest of his career was played in the Ovens & Murray Football League with Corowa-Rutherglen.

References

Holmesby, Russell and Main, Jim (2007). The Encyclopedia of AFL Footballers. 7th ed. Melbourne: Bas Publishing.

1967 births
Living people
North Melbourne Football Club players
New South Wales Australian rules football State of Origin players
Australian rules footballers from New South Wales
Corowa-Rutherglen Football Club players
Corowa-Rutherglen Football Club coaches